Halle-Vilvoorde was a constituency used to elect members of the Flemish Parliament between 1995 and 2003.

Representatives

References

Defunct constituencies of the Chamber of Representatives (Belgium)